Lutz Feldt was Inspector of the Navy from 2003 to 2006.

References

External links 

Vice admirals of the German Navy
1945 births
Living people
Chiefs of Navy (Germany)